Macrostomum is a genus of flatworm with a worldwide distribution, with over a hundred species described to date. These hermaphroditic, free-living flatworms are usually small in size, with large species reaching up to 5 mm in body length (e.g. Macrostomum tuba). They are usually transparent, and the smaller species appear rather round in cross-section than dorsoventrally flattened.

Name 
The term "Macrostomum", meaning "big-mouthed", derives from the Greek μάκρος makros, "large", and στόμα, stoma, mouth. Relative to other turbellaria, Macrostomum species have indeed a long mouth, connected to the gut by a muscular pharynx which can expand, in certain species, to almost the width of the animal.

Ecology 
Macrostomum species inhabit different aquatic or moist environments. Marine and brackish species are often interstitial (living in the space between grains of sediment), whereas freshwater species are also frequently found associated with aquatic plants. Many of these small worms feed on unicellular algae such as diatoms, others on zooplankton or smaller benthic invertebrates.

Species 
This genus includes Macrostomum lignano, a new model organism for studies on different areas of biology, including development, bioadhesion, regeneration, stem cell biology, ageing, toxicology, genomics, and evolution.

The following species are recognised in the genus Macrostomum: 

Macrostomum acus 
Macrostomum acutum 
Macrostomum aegyptium 
Macrostomum amaniense 
Macrostomum amurense 
Macrostomum appendiculatum 
Macrostomum astericis 
Macrostomum auriculatum 
Macrostomum australiense 
Macrostomum axi 
Macrostomum balticum 
Macrostomum baoanensis 
Macrostomum baringoense 
Macrostomum bellebaruchae 
Macrostomum bicaudatum 
Macrostomum bicurvistyla 
Macrostomum boreale 
Macrostomum brandi 
Macrostomum brevituba 
Macrostomum burti 
Macrostomum cairoense 
Macrostomum calcaris 
Macrostomum caprariae 
Macrostomum carolinense 
Macrostomum catarractae 
Macrostomum ceylanicum 
Macrostomum chongqingensis 
Macrostomum christinae 
Macrostomum clavistylum 
Macrostomum clavituba 
Macrostomum cliftonensis 
Macrostomum collistylum 
Macrostomum contortum 
Macrostomum coomerensis 
Macrostomum coxi 
Macrostomum curvata 
Macrostomum curvistylum 
Macrostomum curvituba 
Macrostomum delphax 
Macrostomum deltanensis 
Macrostomum distinguendum 
Macrostomum dongyuanensis 
Macrostomum dorsiforum 
Macrostomum elgonense 
Macrostomum ensiferum 
Macrostomum ermini 
Macrostomum evelinae 
Macrostomum extraculum 
Macrostomum fergussoni 
Macrostomum finnlandense 
Macrostomum flexum 
Macrostomum frigorophilum 
Macrostomum gallicum 
Macrostomum galloprovinciale 
Macrostomum georgeense 
Macrostomum gilberti 
Macrostomum glochistylum 
Macrostomum goharii 
Macrostomum gracile 
Macrostomum graffi 
Macrostomum granulophorum 
Macrostomum greenwoodi 
Macrostomum guttulatum 
Macrostomum hamatum 
Macrostomum heyuanensis 
Macrostomum hofsteni 
Macrostomum hystricinum 
Macrostomum hystrix 
Macrostomum ideficis 
Macrostomum incurvatum 
Macrostomum inductum 
Macrostomum inflatum 
Macrostomum infundibuliferum 
Macrostomum intermedium 
Macrostomum ismailiensis 
Macrostomum janickei 
Macrostomum japonicum 
Macrostomum johni 
Macrostomum karlingi 
Macrostomum kepneri 
Macrostomum korsakovi 
Macrostomum lankouensis 
Macrostomum leptos 
Macrostomum lewisi 
Macrostomum lignano 
Macrostomum lineare 
Macrostomum littorale 
Macrostomum longistyliferum 
Macrostomum longituba 
Macrostomum lutheri 
Macrostomum magnacurvituba 
Macrostomum majesticis 
Macrostomum mediterraneum 
Macrostomum megalogastricum 
Macrostomum minutum 
Macrostomum mirumnovem 
Macrostomum mosquense 
Macrostomum mystrophorum 
Macrostomum nairobiense 
Macrostomum nassonovi 
Macrostomum niloticum 
Macrostomum norfolkensis 
Macrostomum obelicis 
Macrostomum obtusa 
Macrostomum obtusum 
Macrostomum ontarioense 
Macrostomum orthostylum 
Macrostomum parmum 
Macrostomum phillipsi 
Macrostomum phocurum 
Macrostomum pithecusae 
Macrostomum platensis 
Macrostomum poznaniense 
Macrostomum prognosticis 
Macrostomum pseudoobscurum 
Macrostomum pseudosinense 
Macrostomum puntapiedrensis 
Macrostomum purpureum 
Macrostomum qiaochengensis 
Macrostomum quiritium 
Macrostomum rectum 
Macrostomum recurvostylum 
Macrostomum retortum 
Macrostomum reynoldsi 
Macrostomum reynoldsoni 
Macrostomum rhabdophorum 
Macrostomum riedeli 
Macrostomum romanicum 
Macrostomum rostratum 
Macrostomum ruebushi 
Macrostomum saifunicum 
Macrostomum salemensis 
Macrostomum schmitti 
Macrostomum semicirculatum 
Macrostomum sensitivum 
Macrostomum shekouense 
Macrostomum shenandoahense 
Macrostomum shenzhenensis 
Macrostomum shiyanensis 
Macrostomum silesiacum 
Macrostomum sinensis 
Macrostomum sinyaense 
Macrostomum spirale 
Macrostomum stepposus 
Macrostomum stylopensillum 
Macrostomum subterraneum 
Macrostomum taurinum 
Macrostomum tennesseense 
Macrostomum tenuicauda 
Macrostomum thermale 
Macrostomum thingithuense 
Macrostomum timavi 
Macrostomum troubadicus 
Macrostomum truncatum 
Macrostomum tuba 
Macrostomum uncinatum 
Macrostomum vejdovskyi 
Macrostomum velastylum 
Macrostomum virginianum 
Macrostomum viride 
Macrostomum xiamensis 
Macrostomum zhaoqingensis 
Macrostomum zhujiangensis

References

External links 
 Turbellarian Taxonomic Database
 Macrostomum Genome Site
 Evolutionary Research on Macrostomum species at the University of Basel

Turbellaria genera
Taxa named by Eduard Oscar Schmidt
Rhabditophora genera